David S. Gebhard (1927 – 1 March 1996) was a leading architectural historian, particularly known for his books on the architecture and architects of California.  He was a long-time faculty member at the University of California, Santa Barbara, and was dedicated to the preservation of Santa Barbara architecture.

Early life
Gebhard was born and raised in Minnesota; he received his Ph.D. at the University of Minnesota in 1958.  He served, for six years, as director of the Roswell Museum and Art Center in New Mexico, before moving to UC Santa Barbara in 1961.

Career
As a teacher he inspired many students at both the undergraduate and graduate levels.  In addition to his long teaching career, he served as director of the University Art Museum for twenty years, building a small gallery into a significant accredited university museum.   In this position, he initiated the Architectural Drawings Collection, now one of the leading West Coast repositories for architectural materials.  With Robert Winter he co-authored guides to architecture in northern and southern California. 
 
Gebhard was also active in service to his community, serving for many years on the Santa Barbara County Architectural Board of Review.  He was active in the Society of Architectural Historians, and served a term as its president in the 1980s.

Death and legacy
Gebhard died on 1 March 1996. The David Gebhard Memorial Lecture Series is an annual event sponsored by Pasadena Heritage, an architectural preservation organization in Pasadena, California.

Selected publications

1960s
 Prehistoric Paintings of the Diablo Region, A Preliminary Report, Roswell Museum and Art Center, Roswell NM 1960.
 A Guide to the Existing Buildings of Purcell and Elmslie, 1910-1920, Roswell Museum and Art Center, Roswell NM 1960.

1970s
 Charles F. A. Voysey, Hennessey & Ingalls, Los Angeles 1975, 
 A Guide to the Architecture of Minnesota, University of Minnesota Press, Minneapolis MN 1977 (With Tom Martinson)
 The Guide to Architecture in Los Angeles and Southern California,  Peregrine Smith, Santa Barbara 1977,  (joint author)

1980s
 Rudolf Schindler, Architect Viking Press, New York 1972,  ; reprint Peregrine Smith, Santa Barbara 1980, 
 The Guide to Architecture in San Francisco and Northern California,  Gibbs M. Smith Books, Salt Lake City 1985,  (joint author)
 California Romanza: Frank Lloyd Wright in California, Chronicle Books, San Francisco 1988, 
 Los Angeles in the Thirties, 1931-1941, Peregrine Smith, Layton UT 1975, reprint Hennessey & Ingalls, Los Angeles 1989,  (With Harriette Von Breton)

1990s
 Lutah Maria Riggs: A Woman in Architecture, 1921-1980, Capra Press and the Santa Barbara Museum of Art, Santa Barbara 1992, 
  Buildings of Iowa, Oxford University Press, New York,  1993 (With Gerald Mansheim)
  Robert Stacy Judd: Maya Architecture, The Creation of a New Style, Capra Press, Santa Barbara  1993,  (photos by Anthony Peres)
 The National Trust Guide to Art Deco in America, Wiley, New York;  Preservation Press, Washington DC 1996,

References

1927 births
1996 deaths
American architecture writers
American architectural historians
University of California, Santa Barbara faculty
University of Minnesota alumni
Writers from Santa Barbara, California
20th-century American historians
20th-century American male writers
American male non-fiction writers
Historians from California